Epinotia rubricana is a species of moth of the family Tortricidae. It is found in Taiwan, Korea, Japan and Russia.

The wingspan is 16–19 mm.

References

Moths described in 1968
Eucosmini